Éighneachán Ó hAnnluain (1933 – 14 December 1994; sometimes spelled Éineachán) was an Irish Sinn Féin politician. He was elected as a Teachta Dála (TD) at the 1957 general election for the Monaghan constituency. He was one of four successful Sinn Féin candidates in that election, the others being Ruairí Ó Brádaigh, John Joe McGirl and John Joe Rice. None of the four took their seats, for Sinn Féin ran on an abstentionist platform.

In 1960, he was imprisoned for one month in Mountjoy Prison after refusing to pay a fine for the offence of collecting money for republican prisoners' dependents without a permit.

He did not contest the 1961 general election.

Ó hAnnluain died on 14 December 1994, aged 61, in Monaghan.

His brother Fergal O'Hanlon was a member of the anti-Treaty Irish Republican Army. From 1999 until 2012, his sister Pádraigín Uí Mhurchadha was a Monaghan town councillor for Sinn Féin.

References

1933 births
1994 deaths
Members of the 16th Dáil
Politicians from County Monaghan
Sinn Féin TDs (post-1923)